Vermont Life was a quarterly regional magazine focusing on the Vermont lifestyle. It was published by the State of Vermont and was read by Vermont residents and those who live outside the state. The headquarters was in Montpelier. It was known for its scenic photography and articles about Vermont's food/agriculture, arts, outdoor recreation and entrepreneurs. In addition to the quarterly print publication, Vermont Life published two websites, produced a digital version of the magazine, a line of printed calendars, note-cards, and worked with other State of Vermont agencies and organizations on branding Vermont.

History 
The first issue of Vermont Life was published in 1946 as a marketing tool for the State of Vermont. The magazine began accepting advertising in 1991 to defray postage and production costs. The magazine closed in 2018.

Masthead 
Editor: Mary Hegarty Nowlan
Managing Editor: Bill Anderson
Art Director: Susan McClellan
Production Manager: D. J. Goodman
Managing Editor, Vermont Life Media: Judy Thurlow
Food Editor: Melissa Pasanen
Associate Publisher: Sky Barsch
Business Manager: Paul Noseworthy-Williams
Publishing Assistant: Thomas Taylor

References

External links 

Online archive
Digital version of the magazine (Dead link)

1946 establishments in Vermont
2018 disestablishments in Vermont
Lifestyle magazines published in the United States
Local interest magazines published in the United States
Quarterly magazines published in the United States
Defunct magazines published in the United States
Magazines established in 1946
Magazines disestablished in 2018
Magazines published in Vermont